Bruno Trani (29 January 1928 – 7 February 2022) was an Italian sailor who competed in the 1960 Summer Olympics. Born in Italy, Trani died on 7 February 2022, at the age of 94.

References

External links
 

1928 births
2022 deaths
Italian male sailors (sport)
Olympic sailors of Italy
Sailors at the 1960 Summer Olympics – Finn